Aethes iranica is a species of moth of the family Tortricidae. It was described by Razowski, 1963. It is found in Asia Minor and Iran.

References

iranica
Moths described in 1963
Moths of Asia
Taxa named by Józef Razowski